Paul of Taranto was a 13th-century Franciscan alchemist and author from southern Italy. (Taranto is a city in Apulia.) Perhaps the best known of his works is his Theorica et practica, which defends alchemical principles by describing the theoretical and practical reasoning behind it.  It has also been argued that Paul is the author of the much more widely known alchemical text Summa perfectionis, generally attributed to the spurious Jabir, or Pseudo-Geber.

Definitions and Concepts 

When examining Paul’s work, it is important to make the distinction from modern definitions of words to the definitions used by medieval philosophers and scientists.

Substance – Paul does not use “substance” as the modern definition of “material” or “matter.”  Instead, substance describes something that is primary and can exist on its own.

Accident – Paul doesn’t use this term as an unexpected/unplanned event.  Instead, it is simply an attribute, or adjective, and cannot exist on its own.

Form/Substantial Form – Form is something that acts on matter that gives it characteristics (e.g. color, hardness, and heaviness).  Substantial form is a fundamental type of “form.”

As an example to demonstrate:  Substance is simply the object itself, including characteristics that define the object, whereas accidents simply qualify it, but are not necessary for its existence.  For example, a bird could be considered the substance, generally combining characteristics such as feathers, a beak, and the ability to lay eggs.  Describing a bird as big/small or timid/aggressive simply adds qualification to the bird, but is not defining characteristics of a bird.  These concepts of substance and accident stem from Aristotle’s works.

Theorica et practica 

Nature and intellect relationship

Paul argues that human intellect is superior to nature.  Therefore, humans must have the ability to manipulate nature as they see fit.  Sculptures and painters, for example, use nature (marble for statue, paint etc) to create various forms of art.  They take natural materials and manipulate them in such a way (chiseling a statue, combining colors/drawing shapes, patterns, and figures) to create artistic works.  They are able to in a controllable manner alter and improve nature.  This thought is also reflected in the act of writing.  “[T]he hand does not write by the motion alone of nature, but as ruled by intellect through art.”  Artists are able to control nature and use it as a tool or instrument.  This concept of intellect over nature is derived from the pseudo-Aristotelian Liber de Causis.

Two categories of arts

Paul then identifies two categories of arts: “Purely artificial” art alters the extrinsic form or “form of art” and “perfective art” alters the “intrinsic” form (or form of nature).  Purely artificial art only changes nature superficially, whereas perfective art changes the essence of nature.  Paul clarifies this distinction through the use of primary and secondary qualities.  The primary qualities are the four Aristotelian qualities, hot, cold, wet, and dry, which reside in the four elements (earth, water, air, and fire).  Secondary qualities include white, black, sweet, bitter, hard, soft, sharp, and dull.  Perfective art alters the primary qualities, while purely artificial art only results in changes among the secondary qualities; essential changes result from changes in primary qualities, while accidental changes are a result of changes in secondary qualities.  A painter and sculpture, then, only practice artificial art since they change shapes and colors of material.  Physicians are considered to practice perfective art since they attempt to control the four humors, which by their definition are characterized by the primary qualities.  Farmers too, practice perfective art since they work with the transmutation power inherent in seeds.

An analogous modern example of extrinsic versus intrinsic changes is the difference between a physical and chemical reaction.  In a physical reaction, there is no change in the molecules in the system.  Boiling water is a classic example: The system starts with liquid water, and when enough heat has been added to the water, the water boils into the gaseous phase.  While there has been a phase change, the water molecule, H2O hasn’t broken apart and is still present at the end of the reaction, so this is analogous to an extrinsic change.  Electrolysis of water is a chemical change – electricity is used to break water into hydrogen and oxygen gas.  Since the molecules present have been changed, this is a chemical change, similar to an intrinsic change.

Sulfur-mercury theory of metals

One of the goals of Theorica et practica is to affirm the validity of the sulfur-mercury theory of metals, which basically states that metals are composed of sulfur and mercury and the different proportions between the two form different types of metals.  Observations of the reactivity of metals suggest that metals were in fact composed of sulfur and mercury.  When metals were heated, they gave off a sulfurous odor.  When mercury came in contact with metals such as gold, silver, copper, tin, or lead, an amalgam resulted.  These observations lead to the conclusion that metals were composed of both mercury and sulfur.
Paul addresses one of the many arguments against the sulfur-mercury theory: that intermediate substances cannot exist between the pure elements and the “final product.”  Therefore, metals cannot be broken down into sulfur and mercury.  In Theorica et practica, Paul first presents this argument before declining it in a contra and pro fashion.  He first states the argument against the sulfur-mercury theory.  Essentially the argument is as follows: In order to make “A” from “B and C”, “B and C” become corrupted as soon as they combine to make “A,” so “B and C” clearly cannot exist within “A.” 

Paul then rebuttals against this argument in two ways: theoretical examples and scientific experimentations.  One example is how a smaller number can exist in a larger number.  For example, the quantity “3” resides in the quantity “4”; 4 can be viewed as the combination of 3 and 1.  A less abstract example is a live tree and a dead one.  The difference between them is simply the essence of life or its vegetative soul.  The dead tree still contains the substantial form of the wood, so clearly that form must have been there even when the tree was alive.  Paul’s experimental approach is to decompose metals into other materials, then attempt to recombine those materials into the metal again.  If the sulfur-mercury theory is correct, you can decompose metals into the four elements, but when attempting to recombine the elements, there is no reason for the elements to recombine into any one particular metal.  Paul writes that he successfully recreated the same metal after a process of calcining, dissolving, subliming, and lastly reducing metals.  Since he was able to recreate the same metal that he started with, he obviously did not break the metal down into the pure elements, but instead into some intermediate phases.

Notes

Italian alchemists
Italian Franciscans
13th-century alchemists
13th-century Italian writers
13th-century Latin writers